The Romance of a Million Dollars is a 1926 American drama film directed by Tom Terriss and starring Glenn Hunter, Alyce Mills and Gaston Glass.

Cast
 Glenn Hunter as Breck Dunbarton 
 Alyce Mills as Marie Moore 
 Gaston Glass as West MacDonald 
 Jane Jennings as Mrs. Dunbarton 
 Bobby Watson as The Detective 
 Lea Penman as Mrs. Olwin 
 Thomas Brooks as Ezra Dunbarton

References

Bibliography
 Langman, Larry. American Film Cycles: The Silent Era. Greenwood Publishing, 1998.

External links
 

1926 films
1926 drama films
1920s English-language films
American silent feature films
Silent American drama films
Films directed by Tom Terriss
American black-and-white films
Preferred Pictures films
1920s American films